"Kizuna" (stylized as "kizuna") is a song recorded by Japanese singer Aya Ueto, from her debut studio album, Ayaueto. It was released as the album's second single by Flight Master on November 7, 2002. The first pressing of the single included a bonus CD-ROM featuring a special video message from Ueto, as well as a program allowing fans to receive emails from her for a limited period. The song was used in commercials for Karaoke Station by Bandai, starring Ueto herself.

Background
"Kizuna" was released two months following the debut single "Pureness". The track is a midtempo ballad and, like "Pureness," it was written, composed, arranged and produced by T2ya. It was recorded by Ueto on September 13, 2002, the day before her seventeenth birthday. At the time of release, Ueto was in the middle of filming her first feature film, Azumi (2003), and had to learn the lyrics to "Kizuna" on the day of recording. Due to the hectic filming schedule at the time, Ueto did not do any televised promotion for the single. The music video for "Kizuna" was shot on the rooftop of a hotel in Osaka. The video shoot was squeezed in an opening in the filming schedule when the crew for Azumi were moving locations from Kyoto to Hiroshima, giving Ueto just enough time to film the video and get back to set the next day. Ueto has stated that the music video for "Kizuna" is one of her personal favorites.

Chart performance
"Kizuna" entered the daily Oricon Singles Chart at number 3. The single debuted on the weekly chart at number 5, with 32,000 copies sold in the first week. It spent a second week in the top twenty, at number 19, selling 11,000copies, before dropping out the following week. "Kizuna" charted on the Oricon Singles Chart for eleven weeks, selling a reported total of 57,000 copies during its run.

Track listing

Charts

Sales

Release history

References

2002 songs
2002 singles
Aya Ueto songs
Song recordings produced by T2ya
Songs written by T2ya